Sandro Donati (Monte Porzio Catone, 14 June 1947) is an Italian athletics coach.

Biography
He is mostly known for his battle against doping in athletics, soccer, and cycling and for denouncing Italian athletics scandals in the mid-1980s.

He coached the Italy national athletics sprint team from 1977 to 1987, but was dismissed after denouncing the rigged jump of Giovanni Evangelisti at the 1987 World Championships in Athletics held in Rome. Author of several books about doping, he was Head of Research and Experimentation of Italian National Olympic Committee from 1990 to 2006.
In 1999, after Lance Armstrong's first Tour de France victory, Donati assisted The Sunday Times journalist David Walsh in his pursuit of a connection between Armstrong and the infamous "doping doctor", Michele Ferrari.

Books

References

External links
Donati: "La confessione sia totale at La Gazzetta dello Sport web site 

Italian athletics coaches
1947 births
Living people